Aris Thessaloniki Women's Basketball is the women's basketball department of Aris Thessaloniki, the Greek multi-sport club based in Thessaloniki. The club plays in A2 Ethniki (2nd tier) but recently it has played in A1 Ethniki. In 2015-2016 season is on the first place of the second category.

History
The women's team of Aris was founded in 1946 thanks to initiatives of Phaedon Matthaiou. Some years later, the club ceased their activities but returned in 1980s decade. The season 2009-10 played in A1 Ethniki for first time and the next season played in EuroCup Women but disqualified by Dynamo Novosibirsk. In season 2013-14, Aris finished in 7th place but withdrew from the championship due to financial problems and relegated to A2 Ethniki.

Recent seasons

Roster

References

External links
 Official page

Aris Thessaloniki
Women's basketball teams in Greece
Basketball teams established in 1946
Basketball teams in Thessaloniki